Dick Johnson Township is one of eleven townships in Clay County, Indiana. As of the 2010 census, its population was 1,453 and it contained 584 housing units.

History
Dick Johnson Township was established in the late 1830s. This township was named for Richard Mentor Johnson, the ninth Vice President of the United States, serving in the administration of Martin Van Buren. There is also a Van Buren Township in Clay County in honor of the 8th President.

Geography

Cities and towns
 Brazil (northwest edge)

Unincorporated towns
 Bee Ridge
 Perth
 Wickville
(This list is based on USGS data and may include former settlements.)

Adjacent townships
 Raccoon Township, Parke County (north)
 Jackson Township, Parke County (northeast)
 Van Buren Township (east)
 Brazil Township (southeast)
 Posey Township (south)
 Nevins Township, Vigo County (west)

Major highways
  Indiana State Road 59
  Indiana State Road 340

Cemeteries
The township contains seventeen cemeteries: Archer, Carter, Orchard, Perth, Saint Marys, Sampson, Greek Catholic, Cottage Hill, Eldridge, Don & Chris Loughmiller, [Unnamed], Bee Ridge, Rock Run, Kessel, Percals, Odell, & Webster

References
 
 United States Census Bureau cartographic boundary files

External links

 Indiana Township Association
 United Township Association of Indiana

Townships in Clay County, Indiana
Terre Haute metropolitan area
Townships in Indiana
1830s establishments in Indiana
Populated places established in the 1830s